Chalcorana is a genus of frogs in the family Ranidae, "true frogs". They are found in Southeast Asia, from Thailand to Malay Peninsula and the Sunda Islands.

Taxonomy
Chalcorana was originally introduced as a subgenus of Rana. It was often included in the then-diverse genus Hylarana, until Oliver and colleagues revised the genus in 2015, delimiting Hylarana more narrowly and elevating Chalcorana to genus rank.

Description
Chalcorana are small to medium-sized frogs with a long head and bullet-shaped body. The upper lip is usually white. The limbs and the body are gracile. There are many accessory body glands. The dorsum is shagreened and with fine mottling. There may be small, round glands which may be tipped with spicules. The dorsolateral folds are thin or consist of a line of warts. The diagnostic characters of Chalcorana are the first finger being no longer than the second one, large finger discs (at least twice the finger width), and humeral gland that is ⅓–½ of the length of the upper arm.

Species
There are 10 species:

The AmphibiaWeb lists also Chalcorana kampeni, which the Amphibian Species of the World considers a synonym of Sumaterana crassiovis.

References

 
True frogs
Amphibian genera
Amphibians of Asia